This is a list of the candidates of the 2016 Sarawak state election.

Barisan Nasional candidates (82 of 82 seats)
This is a list of the candidates who ran for the Barisan Nasional (using the dacing election symbol) in the 11th Sarawak state election. The party ran a full slate of 82, winning 72.

People's Justice Party candidates (40 of 82 seats)
This is a list of the candidates who ran for the People's Justice Party (using the mata election symbol) in the 11th Sarawak state election. The party nominated candidates in 40 of the 82 state constituencies, winning 3.

Independent candidates (36 candidates contesting in 30 of 82 seats)
This is a list of the candidates who ran as independent candidate (using the EC-approved election symbol) in the 11th Sarawak state election. A total of 36 independent candidates contested in 30 seats, end up without any elected representative.

Democratic Action Party candidates (31 of 82 seats)
This is a list of the candidates who ran for the Democratic Action Party (using the "rocket" election symbol) in the 11th Sarawak state election. The party nominated candidates in 31 of the 82 state constituencies, winning 7.

National Trust Party candidates (13 of 82 seats)
This is a list of the candidates who ran for the National Trust Party (using the A election symbol) in the 11th Sarawak state election. The party nominated candidates in 13 of the 82 state constituencies, end up without any elected representative.

Pan-Malaysian Islamic Party candidates (11 of 82 seats)
This is a list of the candidates who ran for the Pan-Malaysian Islamic Party (using the bulan election symbol) in the 11th Sarawak state election. The party nominated candidates in 11 of the 82 state constituencies, end up without any elected representative.

State Reform Party candidates (11 of 82 seats)
This is a list of the candidates who ran for the State Reform Party (using the "Bintang 9 Bucu" election symbol) in the 11th Sarawak state election. The party nominated candidates in 11 of the 82 state constituencies, end up without any elected representative.

Parti Bansa Dayak Sarawak Baru candidates (5 of 82 seats)
This is a list of the candidates who ran for the Parti Bansa Dayak Sarawak Baru (using the Perisai Parang Lembing election symbol) in the 11th Sarawak state election. The party nominated candidates in 5 of the 82 state constituencies, end up without any elected representative.

References

2016 Sarawak state election